Acton Round is a civil parish in Shropshire, England.  It contains five listed buildings that are recorded in the National Heritage List for England.  Of these, one is listed at Grade I, the highest of the three grades, one is at Grade II*, the middle grade, and the others are at Grade II, the lowest grade.  The parish contains the villages of Acton Round and Muckley, and is otherwise completely rural.  The most important building in the parish is Acton Round Hall; this and two associated structures are listed.  The other listed buildings are a church and a farmhouse.


Key

Buildings

References

Citations

Sources

Lists of buildings and structures in Shropshire